The Baranduz River is a river in north west Iran which flows into the saltwater Lake Urmia. It is named after the village of Baran Duz.

After the building of the Baranduz Dam, the flow of the river was greatly reduced, contributing to the severe desiccation of Lake Urmia.

Barandoz River is the largest river in Iran and Iran is attached to it. One of the famous people named Baranduz was Haj Mohammad Jahangirzadeh Barandozi, who has played a significant role in the issue of Iran's accession to that region.

If the Barandouz river is on the tongues in the world today, it is famous only because of it

References 

Rivers of West Azerbaijan Province